George Peter Shirtcliffe  (born 28 July 1931) is a New Zealand businessman. He was the chairman of Telecom New Zealand, New Zealand's largest listed company, from 1990 to 1999.

Early life and family
Shirtcliffe was born in Palmerston North on 28 July 1931, the son of Nancy Vida Catherine Shirtcliffe (née Lyons) and Geoffrey Shirtcliffe (1906–1948). Sir George Shirtcliffe (1862–1941) was his grandfather. He received his primary education at Wellesley College and Huntley School, and his secondary education at Wanganui Collegiate School. He graduated from Victoria University of Wellington in 1955 with a Bachelor of Commerce. In 1966, he married Margaret Cecilia Bryden, and they had one son and two daughters.

Career

Business career
Director, Telecom Corporation of New Zealand Limited 1999–2001
Chairman, Telecom Corporation of New Zealand Limited 1990–1999
Deputy chairman, Telecom Corporation of New Zealand Limited 1987–1990
Founding chairman, New Zealand Trade Development Board 1986–1990
Chairman, Venture Pacific Ltd 1986–1989
Chief executive/managing director – Goodman Group Limited, and as a Director of its publicly listed associate companies 1976–1985
Member Wellington Stock Exchange 1970–76 (Partner Harcourt Longuet & Co.)
Non-executive director/deputy chairman – A.S.Paterson & Co. Limited 1968–1976
Directorships at various times of companies engaged in wholesale and retail distribution, food processing, transport, tourism, banking, life insurance, manufacturing (plastics and textiles, agribusiness, telecommunications and airlines

Other organisations
Young Enterprise Trust – trustee 2000–2008.
Founding chairman, Enterprise Education Trust 2000–2003
Australia & New Zealand Business Council 1985–2001 Chairman 1988–1990
Samuel Marsden Collegiate School Board 1981–1987
Manufacturing Development Council 1981–1984
Wellington Rotary Club 1973–1977
Wellington City Mission Board 1973–1995

Shirtcliffe was the founding chairman of the Enterprise Education Foundation and later a trustee of the Enterprise New Zealand Trust. He was an active member of the Royal New Zealand Naval Volunteer Reserve from 1953 to 1967, reaching the rank of Lieutenant Commander.

Electoral reform
During the debate over electoral reform in New Zealand in the early 1990s, he led the Campaign for Better Government which unsuccessfully opposed the Mixed Member Proportional system. In the late 2000s, he campaigned for changes to the format of the 2011 referendum.

Honours and awards
Shirtcliffe was appointed a Companion of the Order of St Michael and St George in the 1988 Queen's Birthday Honours, for services to marketing and business management. He received the New Zealand 1990 Commemoration Medal. In 2001, he was inducted into the New Zealand Business Hall of Fame. He is also a fellow of the New Zealand Institute of Chartered Accountants (honorary retired) and a Distinguished Fellow of the Institute of Directors.

References

External links

1931 births
Living people
New Zealand businesspeople
New Zealand Companions of the Order of St Michael and St George
People from Palmerston North
People educated at Wellesley College, New Zealand
People educated at Huntley School, New Zealand
People educated at Whanganui Collegiate School
Victoria University of Wellington alumni